Monongahela is the 14th country studio album by American country music group The Oak Ridge Boys, released in 1988 via MCA Records. The album peaked at number 9 on the Billboard Top Country Albums chart.

The album includes three singles that charted on Hot Country Songs: "Gonna Take a Lot of River", which reached number 1, followed by "Bridges and Walls" at number 10 and "Beyond Those Years" at number 7.

Track listing

Personnel
Compiled from liner notes.

The Oak Ridge Boys
 Duane Allen — lead vocals
 Joe Bonsall — tenor vocals
 Steve Sanders — baritone vocals
 Richard Sterban — bass vocals

Musicians
Dewey Dorough — saxophone
Bessyl Duhon — accordion
John Jarvis — piano, synthesizer
Wade Benson Landry — fiddle
Mike Lawler — synthesizer
Rick Marotta — drums
Leland Sklar — bass guitar
Billy Joe Walker, Jr. — acoustic guitar, electric guitar
Reggie Young — electric guitar

Chart performance

References

1988 albums
The Oak Ridge Boys albums
MCA Records albums
Albums produced by Jimmy Bowen